Justin Zook (born October 16, 1985 in Chicago, Illinois) is an American swimmer. He competed at the 2004, 2008 and 2012 Summer Paralympics, and also represented Springfield College in the NCAA Men's Swimming and Diving Championships.

Zook was born missing half his right foot and with non-functioning growth plates in his right leg; 30 operations lengthened his leg but caused nerve damage, muscle weakness and range of motion problems. He started swimming as physical therapy at age 6.

, Zook holds IPC world records for 100m and 200m backstroke events.

References

External links 
 
 

1985 births
Living people
American male backstroke swimmers
Paralympic swimmers of the United States
Swimmers at the 2012 Summer Paralympics
Swimmers at the 2008 Summer Paralympics
Swimmers at the 2004 Summer Paralympics
Paralympic gold medalists for the United States
American disabled sportspeople
Swimmers from Chicago
World record holders in paralympic swimming
Medalists at the 2004 Summer Paralympics
Medalists at the 2008 Summer Paralympics
Medalists at the 2012 Summer Paralympics
S10-classified Paralympic swimmers
Paralympic bronze medalists for the United States
Paralympic medalists in swimming
20th-century American people
21st-century American people